Loïc Badiashile Mukinayi (born 5 February 1998) is a French professional footballer who plays as a goalkeeper for Segunda División club Burgos. He is a former France youth international.

Club career
Badiashile is a youth exponent from AS Monaco. He made his first team debut on 27 July 2016 in a UEFA Champions League qualifier against Fenerbahçe S.K. replacing Morgan De Sanctis after 13 minutes.

He made his Ligue 1 debut on 20 May 2017 in the final match of Monaco's championship season against Rennes substituting Seydou Sy at half-time.

On 31 January 2019, the last day of the 2018–19 winter transfer window, Badiashile joined league rivals Stade Rennais F.C. on loan until the end of the season. Rennes also secured an option to make the move permanent.

On 1 July 2019, Badiashile joined Cercle Bruges on season-long loan. On 23 September 2020, he moved to Spanish side Las Rozas CF also on loan.

Badiashile left Monaco in July 2021, after opting to not renew his contract. On 31 January 2022, after six months without a club, he returned to Spain after signing for Primera División RFEF side Internacional de Madrid.

On 30 June 2022, Badiashile signed a two-year deal with Segunda División side Burgos CF.

Personal life
Badiashile is of Congolese descent. He is the older brother of Benoît Badiashile, who is a professional footballer for Chelsea in the Premier League.

Career statistics

Club

References

External links
 
 
 
 

1998 births
Living people
Sportspeople from Limoges
French footballers
French expatriate footballers
France youth international footballers
French sportspeople of Democratic Republic of the Congo descent
Association football goalkeepers
Ligue 1 players
Championnat National 2 players
Championnat National 3 players
Challenger Pro League players
Primera Federación players
Segunda División B players
Limoges FC players
AS Monaco FC players
Stade Rennais F.C. players
Cercle Brugge K.S.V. players
Las Rozas CF players
Internacional de Madrid players
Burgos CF footballers
French expatriate sportspeople in Belgium
French expatriate sportspeople in Spain
Expatriate footballers in Belgium
Expatriate footballers in Spain
Footballers from Nouvelle-Aquitaine
Black French sportspeople